E.S.S Mega (European Space Simulator Mega) is a space simulation game published by Tomahawk and developed by Coktel Vision. E.S.S. Mega recreates ESA's space vehicle concepts of the early 1990, specially the Hermes Shuttle. The game was released for MS-DOS and Atari ST in 1991, and Commodore CDTV in 1992.

Gameplay
According to game's manual, the simulated timeline runs from January 2010 to December 2013. During that time you need to make money by placing satellites into orbit, building a space station to run experiments and performing a successful shuttle landings.

The game balances realism and playability, offering real-time 3D graphics and management of many mission details. For example, the player needs to setup space shuttle cargo, crew and fuel. Mission steps include launch, orbital piloting (deploying or maintaining satellites, building and visiting a space station) and landing on a carrier.

Reception
Joystick magazine gave the PC floppy version an 89% score and the CD-Rom version 91%. Amiga Joker gave the CDTV version a 3/5 score. Génération 4 reviewed the PC and Atari ST versions and gave them 77%.

See also
Buzz Aldrin's Race Into Space — a US-Soviet Space Race simulator
Project Space Station
Shuttle (video game)

References

External links

1991 video games
Amiga games
Atari ST games
Commodore CDTV games
DOS games
Coktel Vision games
Space flight simulator games
Realistic space simulators
Video games developed in France